In geometry, the medial disdyakis triacontahedron is a nonconvex isohedral polyhedron. It is the dual of the uniform truncated dodecadodecahedron. It has 120 triangular faces.

Proportions
The dihedral angle equals . Part of each triangle lies within the solid, hence is invisible in solid models.

References

External links 
 

Dual uniform polyhedra